A résumé, sometimes spelled resume (or alternatively resumé), also called a curriculum vitae (CV), is a document created and used by a person to present their background, skills, and accomplishments. Résumés can be used for a variety of reasons, but most often they are used to secure new employment.

A typical résumé contains a summary of relevant job experience and education. The résumé is usually one of the first items, along with a cover letter and sometimes an application for employment, which a potential employer sees regarding the job seeker and is typically used to screen applicants, often followed by an interview.

The curriculum vitae used for employment purposes in the UK (and in other European countries) is more akin to the résumé—a shorter, summary version of one's education and experience—than to the longer and more detailed CV that is expected in U.S. academic circles.

In South Asian countries such as India, Pakistan, and Bangladesh, biodata is often used in place of a résumé.

History
The word "résumé" comes from the French word  meaning 'to summarize'. Leonardo da Vinci is credited with the first résumé, though his "résumé" takes the form of a letter written about 1481–1482 to a potential employer, Ludovico Sforza. For the next 450 years, the résumé continued to be simply a description of a person, including abilities and past employment. In the early 1900s, résumés included information like weight, height, marital status, and religion. By 1950, résumés were considered mandatory and started to include information like personal interests and hobbies. It was not until the 1970s, the beginning of the Digital Age, that résumés took on a more professional look in terms of presentation and content. The start of the 21st century saw a further evolution for résumés on the internet as social media helped people spread résumés faster. In 2003 LinkedIn was launched, which allowed users to post their resumes and skills online. Other than LinkedIn, several other SaaS companies are now helping job seekers with free online  résumé builders. These usually provide templates to insert credentials and experience and create a résumé to download or an online portfolio link to share via social media. With the launch of YouTube in 2006, Video résumés became common, and more and more high school students began to send them to different colleges and universities.

Description
In many contexts, a résumé is typically limited to one or two pages of size A4 or letter-size, highlighting only those experiences and qualifications that the author considers most relevant to the desired position. Many résumés contain keywords or skills that potential employers are looking for via applicant tracking systems, make heavy use of active verbs, and display content in a flattering manner. Acronyms and credentials after the applicant's name should be spelled out fully in the appropriate section of the résumé to increase the likelihood they are found in a computerized keyword scan.

A résumé is a marketing document in which the content should be adapted to suit each individual job application or applications aimed at a particular industry. In late 2002, job seekers and students started making interactive résumés such as résumés having links, clickable phone numbers and email addresses. With the launch of YouTube in 2006, job seekers and students also started to create multimedia and video résumés. Job seekers were able to circumvent the application for employment process and reach employers through direct email contact and résumé blasting, a term meaning the mass distribution of résumés to increase personal visibility within the job market. However, the mass distribution of résumés to employers can often have a negative effect on the applicant's chances of securing employment as the résumés tend not to be tailored for the specific positions the applicant is applying for. It is usually, therefore, more sensible to optimize the résumé for each position applied for and its keywords. In order to keep track of all experiences, keeping a "master résumé" document is recommended, providing job seekers with the ability to customize a tailored résumé while making sure extraneous information is easily accessible for future use if needed.

The complexity or simplicity of various résumé formats tends to produce results varying from person to person, for the occupation, and the industry. Résumés or CVs used by medical professionals, professors, artists, and people in other specialized fields may be comparatively longer. For example, an artist's résumé, typically excluding any non-art-related employment, may include extensive lists of solo and group exhibitions.

Styles
Résumés may be organized in different ways. The following are some of the more common résumé formats:

Reverse chronological résumé
A reverse chronological résumé lists a candidate's job experiences in chronological order (last thing first), generally covering the previous 10 to 15 years. Positions are listed with starting and ending dates. Current positions on a résumé typically list the starting date to the present. The reverse chronological résumé format is most commonly used by professionals who are making advancements in the same vertical. In using this format, the main body of the document becomes the Professional Experience section, starting from the most recent experience and moving chronologically backward through a succession of previous experience. The reverse chronological résumé works to build credibility through experience gained, while illustrating career growth over time and filling all gaps in a career trajectory. A chronological résumé is not recommended to job seekers with gaps in their career summaries. In the United Kingdom the chronological résumé tends to extend only as far back as the applicant's GCSE/Standard Grade qualifications.

Functional résumé
A functional résumé lists work experience and skills sorted by skill area or job function.

The functional résumé is used to focus on skills that are specific to the type of position being sought. This format directly emphasizes specific professional capabilities and utilizes experience summaries as its primary means of communicating professional competency. In contrast, the chronological résumé format will briefly highlight these competencies prior to presenting a comprehensive timeline of career growth through reverse chronological listings, with the most recent experience listed first. The functional résumé works well for those making a career change, having a varied work history or with little work experience. A functional résumé is also preferred for applications to jobs that require very specific skills or clearly defined personality traits. A functional résumé is a good method for highlighting particular skills or experiences, especially when those particular skills or experiences may have derived from a role which was held some time ago. Rather than focus on the length of time that has passed, the functional résumé allows the reader to identify those skills quickly.

Online résumés
As the search for employment has become more electronic, it is common for employers to only accept résumés electronically, either out of practicality or preference. This has changed much about the manner in which résumés are written, read, and processed. Some career experts are pointing out that today a paper-based résumé is an exception rather than the rule.

Many employers and hiring managers now find candidates' résumés through search engines, which makes it more important for candidates to use appropriate keywords when writing a résumé. Larger employers use Applicant Tracking Systems to search, filter, and manage high volumes of résumés. Job ads may direct applicants to email a résumé to a company or visit its website and submit a résumé in an electronic format.

Many employers, and recruitment agencies working on their behalf, insist on receiving résumés in a particular file format. Some require Microsoft Word documents, while others will only accept résumés formatted in HTML, PDF, or plain ASCII text sometimes.

Another consideration for electronic résumé documents is that they are parsed with natural language processors. Résumé parsers may correctly interpret some parts of the content of the résumé but not other parts. The best résumé parsers capture a high percentage of information regarding location, names, titles, but are less accurate with skills, industries and other less structured or rapidly changing data. Résumés written in a standard format are more likely to be correctly interpreted by résumé parsers, and thereby may make the candidate more findable.

One advantage for the employers to online résumés is the significant cost saving compared to traditional hiring methods. Another is that potential employers no longer have to sort through massive stacks of paper.

AI-tools can be used to test résumé template.

Infographic, video and website résumés
As the Internet becomes more driven by multimedia, job-seekers have sought to take advantage of the trend by moving their résumés away from the traditional paper and email media to website résumés or e-résumés.

Video, infographic, and even Vine résumés have gained popularity recently, though mainly in the creative and media industries.

This trend has attracted criticism from human resources management professionals, who warn that this may be a passing fad and point out that multimedia-based résumés may be overlooked by recruiters whose workflow is designed only to accommodate a traditional résumé format.

Résumé evaluation
Many résumé development agencies offer résumé evaluation services wherein they evaluate the résumé and suggest any necessary changes. Candidates are free to either do those changes themselves or may take help of the agency. Some career fields include a special section listing the lifelong works of the author: for computer-related fields, the softography; for musicians and composers, the discography; for actors, a filmography.

Keeping résumés online has become increasingly common for people in professions that benefit from the multimedia and rich detail that are offered by an HTML résumé, such as actors, photographers, graphic designers, developers, dancers, etc. Job seekers are finding an ever-increasing demand to have an electronic version of their résumé available to employers and professionals who use Internet recruiting. Online résumé distribution services have emerged to allow job seekers to distribute their résumés to numerous employers of their choice through email.

Résumé as one part of a personal branding mix
In some sectors, particularly in the startup community, use of traditional résumé has seen a consistent decline. While standalone résumés are still used to apply for jobs, job seekers may also view their résumés as one of a number of assets which form their personal brand and work together to strengthen their job application. In this scenario, résumés are generally used to provide a potential employer with factual information (e.g., achievements), while the social media platforms give insight into the job seekers' motivations and personality in development.

See also
 Background check
 Europass European Standardized model
 Federal resume
 Résumé fraud
 Curriculum vitae
 Cover letter
 Résumé parsing
 Video resume

Notes

References

Bibliography

 Bennett, Scott A. The Elements of Résumé Style: Essential Rules and Eye-Opening Advice for Writing Résumés and Cover Letters that Work. AMACOM, 2005 .
 Whitcomb, Susan Britton. Resume Magic: Trade Secrets of a Professional Resume Writer, Third Edition. JIST Publishing, 2006. .
 Thiollet, Jean-Pierre.Euro CV, Paris, Top Editions, 1997. 

Business documents